WHRV is a Public Radio formatted broadcast radio station licensed to Norfolk, Virginia, serving Hampton Roads. It is the flagship National Public Radio member station for Hampton Roads, and is a sister station to the area's PBS member, WHRO-TV. It airs a mix of NPR news and talk programming, jazz, blues, and folk music.

It is owned by the Hampton Roads Educational Telecommunications Association, a consortium of 19 Hampton Roads and Eastern Shore school districts. Studios are located at the Public Telecommunications Center for Hampton Roads on the campus of Old Dominion University in Norfolk. The transmitter is located in Suffolk, Virginia.

WHRV broadcasts in the HD Radio (hybrid) format.

History

The station first signed on in 1973 as WTGM, owned by the Virginia Cultural Foundation. Within only two years, however, the station ran into severe financial straits, forcing HRETA (then known as the Hampton Roads Educational Television Association) to step in and rescue the station. HRETA changed the calls to WHRO-FM in 1978 to match the television station. In the early 1980s, a feasibility study indicated that a second public radio station could be viable. However, it was not until 1988 that HRETA won a second noncommercial license, on 90.3. On September 21, 1990, 90.3 signed on as a full-time classical music station, taking the WHRO-FM call letters. NPR programming remained on 89.5 under new call letters, WHRV.

HD Radio

Repeaters

WHRV operates a number of full-powered repeater stations to serve portions of the Eastern Shore and Southside Virginia.
 

Additionally, the station operates a 250 watt translator station, W269BQ, at 101.7 MHz in Virginia Beach, which serves sections of that community that do not get a clear signal from 89.5.

References

External links
 WHRV Online
 

1973 establishments in Virginia
Public radio stations in the United States
NPR member stations
Radio stations established in 1973
HRV
HRV